George William Faulkner  (January 24, 1874 – February 20, 1944) was an American politician who served as   Mayor of Pittsfield, Massachusetts.

Notes

Mayors of Pittsfield, Massachusetts
1874 births
1944 deaths